Jorge Eduardo Ballesteros (born 10 March 1976) is a Mexican alpine skier. He competed in two events at the 1992 Winter Olympics.

References

1976 births
Living people
Mexican male alpine skiers
Olympic alpine skiers of Mexico
Alpine skiers at the 1992 Winter Olympics
Sportspeople from Mexico City
20th-century Mexican people